Defect Designer is a progressive death metal band from Oslo but originally coming from Akademgorodok, part of the Siberian city Novosibirsk.

History
In 2007 Defect Designer in Novosibirsk recorded their first four-track promo named "W". Having sent the demo worldwide the band received plenty of positive feedback and decided to go to a European studio to record a full-length album.

In February, 2008 Defect Designer entered Hertz Studio, Poland (which had previously recorded Vader, Decapitated, Behemoth, Sceptic) without any financial support from labels. The band traveled 4000 km from their hometown to Poland and recorded, mastered and mixed 12 tracks with the Wieslawski brothers.

In 2009 the band were noticed by My Kingdom music and became the first metal acts from Siberia to have a worldwide release.

In 2012 frontman relocated to Oslo severing ties with all members. Defect Designer released the second album "Ageing Accelerator" in 2015 - recording it with musicians from SepticFlesh, Cryptopsy and Trollfest.

The current lineup includes Trollfest, Diskord and Vingulmork members. 
The band has signed a multi-album contract with Transcending Obscurity label in April, 2020 planning a release of the Neanderthal EP further in 2022.

Discography
Studio albums
 Wax (September, 2009, My Kingdom Music)
 Ageing Accelerator (2015, Sleaszy Rider Records)
 TBA (Transcending Obscurity Records)

EPs
 W (2007) - recorded in April, 2007
 AA (December, 2013, digitally)
 Neanderthal (July, 2022, Transcending Obscurity Records)

Compilations
V/A Siberian Death metal CD (2007)
V/A Putrid Tunes Compilation CD (2008)

Video clips
 When Your Face Doesn't Melt Snowflakes - directed by Nader Sadek, taken from the "Wax" album. 
 Yellow Grimace lyrics video - directed by Richard Oakes
 Crusaders lyrics video - directed by Richard Oakes
 Cowboys lyrics video - Portishead cover
 StarDust animated video
 Wrinkles

References 
 Legacy Zine Article
 Heavy Impact Zine interview
 Stereo Invaders Zine interview
 Death Metal Without Borders - Defect Designer Going International With New Album 
 Defect Designer join Transcending Obscurity

External links
 Defect Designer official website
 Defect Designer start recording second album with Cryptopsy and SepticFlesh members at BW&BK

Russian technical death metal musical groups
Musical groups from Novosibirsk
Norwegian death metal musical groups
Technical death metal musical groups
Norwegian progressive metal musical groups
Musical groups from Bærum
Musical quartets